Alfie Evan Allen (born 12 September 1986) is an English actor. He portrayed Theon Greyjoy on all eight seasons of the HBO fantasy series Game of Thrones (2011–2019), for which he received a nomination for the Primetime Emmy Award for Outstanding Supporting Actor in a Drama Series in 2019. In film, he is best known for his starring roles in John Wick (2014), The Predator (2018), and Jojo Rabbit (2019).

Early life and education
Allen was born on 12 September 1986 in Hammersmith, London, the son of film producer Alison Owen and actor Keith Allen. His older sister is singer Lily Allen; her song "Alfie" is about him. His uncle is actor Kevin Allen. He is a third cousin of singer Sam Smith. He attended Windlesham House School in Sussex, Embley Park School near Romsey, St John's College in Portsmouth, and the Fine Arts College in Hampstead, where he studied for his A-levels.

Career
Allen's first professional appearance was in a one-off Channel 4 comedy, You Are Here in 1998, co-written by Matt Lucas and David Walliams. The same year, Allen and his sister Lily appeared in the 1998 film Elizabeth, which was produced by their mother.

His early work included small roles in Agent Cody Banks 2: Destination London, directed by his uncle, the film Atonement, and in BBC1's historical hospital drama, Casualty 1907, as Nobby Clark. Starting in Chichester on 31 January 2008, he took over Daniel Radcliffe's role in a revival of Equus on a nationwide tour.

In April 2009, Allen co-starred with then-partner Jaime Winstone in the music video for "Dust Devil" by Madness. He also had a role in the BBC2 film, Freefall. He continued to work in films, appearing in Soulboy, The Kid, Freestyle and Powder in 2010.

Allen came to international attention when he was cast as Theon Greyjoy in the HBO fantasy series Game of Thrones, an adaptation of George R. R. Martin's A Song of Ice and Fire, in 2011. Originally auditioning for the role of Jon Snow, he appeared as a series regular for 8 seasons and was nominated for a Primetime Emmy Award for Best Supporting Actor in 2019 for the show's final season.

Allen starred in the 2012 British thriller Confine, and then opposite Keanu Reeves in the 2014 film John Wick. In 2016, directed by Mike Christie, he filmed a two part documentary for the History Channel titled Football: A Brief History, about the roots of association football. That same year, he played Ringwood in the BBC Two 1940s-set miniseries Close to the Enemy and joined the London production of Jesse Eisenberg's The Spoils at Trafalgar Studios.

Allen co-starred in the sci-fi sequel The Predator as Lynch in 2018, and Taika Waititi's Oscar-nominated dark comedy Jojo Rabbit as Finkel as well as the coming-of-age film How to Build a Girl as John Kite in 2019. He had a recurring role as Isaac Pincher in the third series of the period drama Harlots.

In 2020, Allen appeared in the ITV crime drama White House Farm as Brett Collins. Allen made his Broadway debut in 2022 when he took over the role of Mooney from Dan Stevens in Martin McDonagh's Hangmen at John Golden Theatre. For his performance, Allen received a Tony Award nomination for Best Featured Actor in a Play. In 2022, he starred as Jock Lewes in the BBC One World War II miniseries SAS: Rogue Heroes.

Personal life
From 2017 to 2019, Allen was in a relationship with disc jockey Allie Teilz, with whom he has a daughter, born October 2018. He is a supporter of English football club Arsenal.

Filmography

Film

Television

Stage

Awards and nominations

References

External links

 

1986 births
Living people
21st-century English male actors
English male film actors
English male stage actors
English male television actors
English people of Welsh descent
Lily Allen
Male actors from London
People educated at Fine Arts College
People educated at St John's College, Portsmouth
People educated at Windlesham House School
People from Hammersmith